Fallen Angels is a 1995 Hong Kong neo-noir crime drama film written and directed by Wong Kar-wai. It features two intertwined storylines—one tells the story of a hitman wishing to leave the criminal underworld (Leon Lai), the prostitute he starts a relationship with (Karen Mok), and his agent, who is infatuated with him (Michelle Reis). The other story is of a mute ex-convict on the run from the police  (Takeshi Kaneshiro) and a mentally unstable woman dumped by her boyfriend (Charlie Yeung). Set in 1995 pre-Handover Hong Kong, Fallen Angels explores the characters' loneliness, their alienation from the situations around them, and yearning for connections in a hectic city.

Wong initially wrote Fallen Angels as the third story of its predecessor, Chungking Express (1994), but split them into two separate movies due to their cumulative length. Similar to Chungking Express, Fallen Angels features a fragmented narrative that emphasises mood and atmosphere over structure. Whereas its predecessor incorporates bright daytime colours, Fallen Angels consists of scenes exclusively shot at night and using darker colours alongside bright neons. Wong considered the two movies to be complementary counterparts exploring contemporary Hong Kong. Cinematographer Christopher Doyle extensively used wide-angle lens to distort the characters' faces on the screen, conveying their isolation from the surrounding world. Doyle also creates distorted tension in scenes of extreme violence with frantic, out-of-focus visuals. The soundtrack extensively uses Trip hop and pop songs to convey mood and maintain an “urban environment” that plays with popular culture.

Fallen Angels was released in September 1995. Upon release, film critics commented that its styles resembled those deployed in Chungking Express; many lamented that Wong had become self-indulgent, though as time went on critics began to be more appreciative of the film. At the 15th Hong Kong Film Awards in 1996, it won three awards: Best Supporting Actress for Mok, Best Cinematography for Doyle, and Best Original Score for Roel A. Garcia and Frankie Chan. Retrospectively, critics commented that though Fallen Angels was not as groundbreaking as its predecessor, it remained one of Wong's most captivating films cementing his trademark styles. The film's abstract, non-conventional style, the context in which it was made, and its use of pastiche and intertextuality with regards to both popular culture and its predecessor Chungking Express have led to the movie being described as a postmodern film and as suggesting a postmodern reading.

The movie has since its release encompassed a large cult following, and is also the last film Wong fully shot in his native Hong Kong before embarking on more ambitious international productions.

Plot
The movie is composed of two stories that intersect with each other at differing times throughout the films, especially when some of the characters happen to be in the same place at the same time. 
The stories merge at the end of the film. Both stories take place in 1995 in British Hong Kong.

First story
The story opens with the internal monologue of a hit man named Wong Chi-ming (Leon Lai) and a woman he calls his "partner” (Michelle Reis). The two are sitting next to each other in the first scene, a scene covered in smoke and a black-and-white grainy filter. They exchange few words as they smoke cigarettes - suggesting the two share a distant and un-emotional relationship.
After the hitman says his lines in response to the partner's question ("Are we still partners?")  suggesting in his response "Partners should never be emotionally involved with each other.", the scene cuts into the story.

From the beginning, it becomes obvious the pair, despite being business partners for nearly 3 years (“155 weeks”), hardly know each other and rarely see each other, exchanging their plans for their kills over letters and faxes. It seems that the two have agreed to maintain a strictly professional relationship, whether that is the true desires of both of them or not. Despite this, the hitman's assistant, a provocatively dressed woman in short PVC skirts/dresses, fishnet stockings and suspenders, chokers, luxury handbags and high-heeled shoes that create the impression she is a prostitute or a club-goer rather than a hitman's assistant, cleans the hitman's crammed apartment near an underground railway, buys him some groceries (mainly beer) and faxes him blueprints of the places where he is to commit his murders. Obsessed with Wong in a romantic way and infatuated with his mysterious nature, she even goes through his trash, trying to get to know what kind of person he is. It is very clear that she has developed feelings for him despite his insistence on keeping to business. This emotionless approach to contract killing works well for the two in their first kill of the night, going smoothly and seamless. However, on the bus he runs into someone who recognises him from a more innocent time, a cheery old classmate called Ah-Hoi who is about to get married. Wong wryly notes in voiceover: "Even if you're a killer, you still have classmates from grade school around." 
The old classmate tries to sell him an insurance policy, but the hitman won't get one because it only reminds him that he wouldn't have anyone to name as a beneficiary; this reminds him that he is living an entirely solitary existence, travelling from place to place, in a non-functioning relationship with his assistant, engaging in contract killing.

Wong, a hitman who works for different clients, however appears to not care much for the consequences of his bloody deeds and even suggests at his lack at planning as a reason for his enjoyment of contract killing, suggesting this also as a reason for his “partner”. Since her “partner” keeps to himself, she frequents the bar he goes to just to sit in his seat and daydream about him. After playing a piece of music on the bar's jukebox, the hitman's assistant and her daydreaming about Wong prompts her to masturbate in the apartment's bed in an attempt to relieve her sexual frustration in not seeing him. Afterwards, the hitman's assistant encounters Ho Chi-mo, a mute ex-convict on the run from the police (Takeshi Kaneshiro) in her apartment building, the dense and chaotic Chungking Mansions. (This encounter is discussed in the “Second Story” section). During their second killing of the night, the Hitman and his assistant notably put more emotion on the job, wandering around the area in a way that suggests they are looking around for each other. The job is successful, but results in a bloody mess and Wong injures his arm in the process.

Increasingly frustrated by the monotone, futile life of contract killing following his encounter with his old classmate, as well as a lack of free will, Wong considers ending his career as a hitman. However he wishes not to upset his partner, and so two weeks after he is injured, he asks to see his assistant, but does not show up to her visible annoyance. Certain that she will show up at the bar in a couple of days looking for him, he asks the bartender to leave a piece of music on the Jukebox called “Forget Him” (忘記他) with the number “1818”. The lyrics in this song tell her to forget the hitman, as he wishes for her to do. After listening to the music on the jukebox, understanding from the lyrics that the hitman wants her to forget him, the hitman's assistant is heartbroken and cries alone by the bar. Meanwhile, Wong has a late night meal at McDonald's where he encounters an eccentric, mischief-making prostitute nicknamed “Blondie” (Karen Mok) for her dyed blonde hair, who sits next to him and invites him into her apartment. While they spend time together, captured in crazy and wild scenes, the scene is juxtaposed against the hitman's assistant with her glamorous make-up all smudged, as she masturbates again to calm her upset nerves, smokes a cigarette on the apartment's bed and breaks down crying.

While spending time with the hitman, Blondie has illusions that he is the ex-lover who left her for another woman (likely the hitman's assistant). Whether this is truth or not is never explicitly confirmed. Meanwhile, the hitman's assistant, travelling late at night on Hong Kong's MTR subway network, briefly walks past Blondie in a subway station, in which the two turn back and look at each other, each woman detecting Wong's scent on the other. The hitman's assistant showing visible rage in her expression, suggesting she knows about the relationship and is enamoured with rage and jealousy.

After Wong and his assistant meet again in a darkly-lit scene, he tells her he wants to terminate their business relationship. She asks that he do her one more favour - another killing job. By this point, a clear emotional rift is present between the two. Afterwards, Wong decides to break up his relationship with Blondie, leaving her heart broken and in an emotional outburst where she bites him in the pouring rain and screams: “I've left my mark, okay? You may forget my face, but you won't forget my bite.” However, an apathetic man, the hitman does not feel guilty for breaking her heart. "For her, I'm just a stopover on the journey of her life," he states. "I hope she reaches her destination soon.” With all emotion possible now placed on the cold line of work that is contract killing, the hitman sets out for his final killing job. Meanwhile, the hitman's assistant makes a phone call that gives away Wong's location to rivals - revealing the job to be a set-up. With a heavily tense atmosphere present from Wong, a notable departure from Wong's usual insistence on emotional matters staying out of professional work, Wong drinks alcohol and braces himself in the bathroom for a tense showdown, however Wong is killed while attempting to carry out the job. Wong however is pleased that he has finally been able to achieve free will; that is, the free will to make his own decisions and die.

Second story
The hitman’s assistant lives in the same building, the dense and chaotic Chungking Mansions, with Ho Chi-mo (Takeshi Kaneshiro), an ex-convict who has escaped prison and is on the run from the police. Recognising their shared backgrounds in criminality, she helps him elude the police when they search for him. Ho is mute and still lives with his father. For work, he breaks into other people's businesses at night and sells their goods and services, often forcibly to unwilling customers. He keeps running into the same girl at night, Charlie. Every time they meet, she cries on his shoulder and tells him the same sob story. Her ex-boyfriend, Johnny, left her for a girl named Blondie. She enlists his help in searching for Blondie. Ho Chi-mo falls in love. Later, she stands him up and he changes his ways, beginning a friendship and work relationship with a restaurant manager. He begins to film things around him with a video camera. His father passes away; he falls back into abusive habits, going so far as to cut off the hair of a man whose family he in the past forced to eat an excessive amount of ice cream. He and Charlie do not come into contact for a few months, but they run into each other while he is masquerading as a business owner. She is in a stewardess uniform and in a new relationship. She does not acknowledge him.

Ending
Sometime later, with the intense blue of the very early morning hours drenching the dingy café in which she is sitting, the hitman’s assistant is sitting alone by herself. A woman usually associated with the grunge glamour in which she dresses, the agent appears a dishevelled mess, with no make-up. She comments on how, having decided to never again be personally involved with her partners in the aftermath of Wong’s death, she has been suffering in a suggested long period of depression. Close to her in the same café, by chance, Ho-Chi mo is also sitting by himself when he is beaten up into a bloodied mess by a local gang, which the hitman’s agent observes, suggesting that in the aftermath of his father’s death, Ho Chi-mo has returned to his previous abusive habits. The two are clearly shadows of their former selves; these developments are regressions for these characters-—real ‘fallen angels’. After he is beat up, the hitman’s assistant realises the ex-convict is feeling the same sense of loss as her, with a silent spark between them that they both feel. After helping him get up from being beaten up, the ex-convict offers the assistant a ride home on his motorbike. He comments that while there’s no chemistry - they’d let too many chances pass them by - there is still some kind of connection. As they ride through early-hours Hong Kong in an alternation of frenetic camerawork and pixillated slo-mo, they cross through the Cross-Harbour Tunnel in scenes evocative of those of Ho Chi-mo and Charlie earlier in the film, into the Hong Kong skyline, with its morning light being the first and only instance of daytime in the movie; suggesting there is ‘light at the end of the tunnel’ for the both of them. The hitman’s assistant comments that even though it’s just a moment and that she hasn’t been close to a man in ages, she enjoys the warmth he brings in this moment, suggesting there is emotional redemption in sight for these ‘fallen angels’.

Cast
 Leon Lai as Wong Chi-ming, the hitman
 Michelle Reis as the Hitman’s agent/assistant
 Takeshi Kaneshiro as Ho Chi-mo, the mute ex-convict (He Zhiwu in Mandarin)
 Charlie Yeung as Charlie
 Karen Mok as Situ Hui-Ling, known as “Blondie”
 Chan Fai-hung as Man forced to eat ice cream
 Chan Man-lei as Ho Chi-mo's father
 Toru Saito as Sato, the Japanese restaurant owner
 Benz Kong as Ah-Hoi, the hitman’s childhood classmate

Development and production
Originally conceived by Wong as the third story for 1994's Chungking Express involving a lovesick hitman, it was cut after he decided that it was complete without it, and that the tone of the more demented content was not suited for the more light-hearted Chungking Express. Wong Kar-wai also explained that he had had so much pleasure in making the first story of Chungking Express that he felt he had made the film too long, and so he decided to skip the third story in releasing Chungking Express. After the release of Chungking Express, Wong noted that the story of a lovesick hitman still interested him, and so he decided to develop it into Fallen Angels. Wong also decided to “gender-reverse” the attributes of the roles in his new film, with the gun-wielding attributes of Brigitte Lin in Chungking Express being manifested in the hitman Leon Lai would play, while the sneaking-in of Faye Wong in Chungking Express to other apartments was reversed by Takeshi Kaneshiro’s character sneaking into shops and businesses in Fallen Angels.

He instead decided to develop the story further into its own feature film and borrowed elements of Chungking Express, such as themes, locations and methods of filming. Wanting to also try to differentiate it from Chungking and to try something new, Wong decided along with cinematographer Christopher Doyle to shoot mainly at night and using extreme wide-angle lenses, keeping the camera as close to the talents as possible to give a detached effect from the world around them.

Many of the plot devices are related to those deployed in its predecessor Chungking Express. The wide-angle distortion of images creates an effect of distance-in-proximity, conveying the characters' solitude. The visuals are frantic, out-of-focus, and neon-lit. Rather than relying on dialogues, the story is narrated through characters' voiceovers. The film's use of pop songs has also received extensive commentary.

There is also the use of different film stocks throughout the film and also a number of scenes where the film switches to black and white inserts covered in a grainy 'noise' effect. There is also a constant sense of Doyle's camera being present that is never disguised, with meticulous use of hand-held camera movement in the film. This 'follows' the characters as they move through a scene. The film also makes use of “claustrophobic” shots involving fast and slow camera movements in a frenetic pace interpolated within crowded, chaotic locations in Hong Kong.  The film’s colours are also distorted, with a distinctive green filter reminiscent of 1990s grunge aesthetics.

A particularly heavy theme of Fallen Angels is the city of Hong Kong itself, with “bedazzling shots” of sites associated with 1990s Hong Kong such as neon-lit billboards and now-closed Kai Tak Airport, as well as the city's visual landscape and 1990s uncertainty and anxieties present in its population at the time because of the looming handover of Hong Kong to China overwhelming the mood and feel of the film. Fallen Angels as such has been described as a "time capsule" of Hong Kong's mid-to-late-20th-century cultural golden age before its handover to China in 1997. Wong himself stated that the movie's main character is the "city itself".

In an interview, Wong had this to say:

Soundtrack
Typical for a Wong Kar-wai film, Fallen Angels extensively uses pop songs, featuring a largely Trip hop soundtrack that appealed to the widespread popularity of Trip hop in 1994-1995. Wong Kar-wai initially wished to use the music of English Trip hop band Massive Attack, however discovered it was too expensive, and so asked his composer in Hong Kong (Frankie Chan) to compose something similar in style. As such, one track that is played prominently throughout the film is "Because I'm Cool" by Nogabe "Robinson" Randriaharimalala. It is a re-orchestration of Karmacoma by Massive Attack, and samples the song. Also featured in the Fallen Angels soundtrack is a dream pop version of "Forget Him" sung by Shirley Kwan, a reworking of the classic by Teresa Teng, and one of the very few "contemporary" Cantopop songs ever used by Wong Kar-wai in his films. In the film, the song is used by the hitman to indirectly communicate the message to his assistant that he wants her to “forget him”, and is also used in the scenes afterwards in the McDonald’s restaurant, where it plays over the restaurant’s speakers as the hitman and Blondie encounter each other, a scene juxtaposed by the misery and sadness of the assistant crying. In contrast to Wong’s other films such as Chungking Express, Fallen Angels’ soundtrack displays more ‘ethereal pieces’, featuring the 1994 avant-garde/experimental ambient piece "Speak My Language" by American avant-garde artist Laurie Anderson. The song is used in scenes where the hitman’s assistant visits the bar that the hitman frequents and masturbates in his room out of sexual frustration. The song, a moody track speaking of the living and the dead, is emblematic of the film’s highly bleak outlook. In the ending scene, the Flying Pickets version of “Only You” is used, described as the only track in the film to express hopefulness, as the hitman’s assistant and the ex-convict find a chance to escape from the film’s seemingly perpetual night, and as they end the film seeking emotional redemption in their shared loss and the sunrise that emerges over the Hong Kong skyline. The film’s official soundtrack was originally released on CD in 1995 but has since been occasionally re-released.

Critical reception
Fallen Angels was released in September 1995, premiering at the 1995 Toronto International Film Festival, where it received considerable critical success and became the focus of the festival for its notable visual style.

In the Chicago Sun-Times, Roger Ebert gave Fallen Angels three stars out of a possible four. Ebert stated the film appealed to a niche audience including art students, "the kinds of people you see in the Japanese animation section of the video store, with their sleeves cut off so you can see their tattoos", and "those who subscribe to more than three film magazines", but would prove unsuitable for an average moviegoer. Stephen Holden of The New York Times said the film relied more on style than substance and wrote: "Although the story takes a tragic turn, the movie feels as weightless as the tinny pop music that keeps its restless midnight ramblers darting around the city like electronic toy figures in a gaming arcade."

In the Village Voice, J. Hoberman wrote:The acme of neo-new-wavism, the ultimate in MTV alienation, the most visually voluptuous flick of the fin de siècle, a pyrotechnical wonder about mystery, solitude, and the irrational love of movies that pushes Wong's style to the brink of self-parody.

Hoberman and Amy Taubin both placed Fallen Angels on their lists for the top 10 films of the decade, and the Village Voices decade-end critics poll placed Fallen Angels at No. 10, the highest-ranking of any Wong Kar-wai film.

Rotten Tomatoes reported that 95% of critics have given the film a positive review based on 22 reviews, with an average rating of 7.90/10. On Metacritic, the film has a weighted average score of 71 out of 100 based on 13 critic reviews, indicating "generally favorable reviews".

Author Stephen Teo, in the book Wong Kar-wai: Auteur of Time, considered Fallen Angels Wong's most social and political film. Meanwhile, Peter Brunette stated the nonlinear structure and "anti-realist, hyperstylized" cinematography of Fallen Angels and its predecessor Chungking Express pointed towards the future of cinema. Scholars Justin Clemens and Dominic Pettman commented on the social and political undertones of Fallen Angels: by portraying the characters' loneliness, alienation and indecisiveness, the film represents a metaphor for the political climate of contemporary Hong Kong, the impending end of British rule and transition to Chinese rule in 1997. Film critic Thorsten Botz-Bornstein highlighted Fallen Angels as a film that represented Wong's peculiar appeal to both traditional "Eastern" and "Western" audiences—it portrays Hong Kong with "post-colonial modernity" showcased through crammed apartments, public transportation, noodle parlors that were emblematic of modern Asia's consumerism. On the one hand, those elements could not be rightfully called "traditionally Asian"; on the other, Western audience viewed such elements with astounding curiosity.

Box office
The film made HK$7,476,025 during its Hong Kong run.

On 21 January 1998, the film began a limited North American theatrical run through Kino International, grossing US$13,804 in its opening weekend in one American theatre. The final North American theatrical gross was US$163,145.

In 2004, Australian distribution company Accent Film Entertainment released a remastered widescreen version of the film enhanced for 16x9 screens.

Home media and streaming
Kino International, who initially distributed the film on DVD, prepared a re-release of the film from a new high-definition transfer on 11 November 2008. Kino released the film on Blu-ray in America in March 26, 2010. It has since gone out of print.

The film was picked up by the Criterion Collection and given a new Blu-ray release on March 23, 2021 in a collection of 7 Wong Kar-wai films.

Also, Fallen Angels could previously be streamed on FilmStruck (shut down in 2018) and is currently available on The Criterion Collection subscription service channel. In May 2019, Wong Kar Wai announced that all of his films would be remastered by his production studio, Jet Tone Productions, and be distributed in the United States through Janus Films and the Criterion Collection. It was released in the UK on DVD and Blu-ray by Artificial Eye.

Awards and nominations

See also
Cinema of Hong Kong
Hong Kong in films
List of Hong Kong films

References

Sources

External links
 
 
 

1995 films
1995 comedy-drama films
1995 crime drama films
1995 independent films
1990s Cantonese-language films
1990s crime comedy-drama films
1990s Hong Kong films
1990s Mandarin-language films
1990s romantic comedy-drama films
Fiction with unreliable narrators
Films about contract killing
Films directed by Wong Kar-wai
Films partially in color
Films set in Hong Kong
Films shot in Hong Kong
Hong Kong crime comedy-drama films
Hong Kong New Wave films
Hong Kong neo-noir films
Hong Kong independent films
Hong Kong romantic comedy-drama films
Postmodern films
Romantic crime films